Kuraki may refer to:
Kuraki, Iran (disambiguation), places in Iran
Mai Kuraki (b. 1982), Japanese singer